Gennadi Mikhailovich Bondaruk (born 1 July 1965) is a Russian professional football coach and a former player. He also holds Georgian citizenship.

Playing career
He made his professional debut in the Soviet Second League in 1982 for FC Atommash Volgodonsk.

References

1965 births
Living people
Sportspeople from Brest, Belarus
Soviet footballers
Russian footballers
Association football defenders
Russian Premier League players
FC Dinamo Sukhumi players
FC Guria Lanchkhuti players
FC Zhemchuzhina Sochi players
Russian football managers
FC Zhemchuzhina Sochi managers
FC Taganrog players
FC Neftekhimik Nizhnekamsk players
FC Leningradets Leningrad Oblast managers
FC SKA Rostov-on-Don managers